Neal Keith Miller (born March 7, 1962) is an American former professional baseball player, who played in Major League Baseball (MLB) for the Philadelphia Phillies.

Sources

References

External links

Skyline High School (Dallas) alumni
Major League Baseball outfielders
Philadelphia Phillies players
Bend Phillies players
Peninsula Pilots players
Reading Phillies players
Portland Beavers players
Maine Guides players
Maine Phillies players
Scranton/Wilkes-Barre Red Barons players
Buffalo Bisons (minor league) players
Lubbock Christian Chaparrals baseball players
Oklahoma City Stars baseball players
Oklahoma City 89ers players
Baseball players from Dallas
1962 births
Living people